LML may refer to:

 Lazy ML, a programming language 
 Lightweight markup language in computing
 Lifecycle Modeling Language, in systems engineering
 Lohia Machinery Limited, scooter company
 L.M.L. (album), a music album by group Nu Virgos